George Morel (born 20 September 1967 in New York) is a DJ and record producer. He is considered "one of the central figures in the early-'90s New York garage/house scene".

Life and career
Morel is of Puerto Rican descent. His DJ career began in the New York clubs Red Zone, Palladium, Traxs and Save the Robots.

His record producing career started in 1989, when he co-wrote and co-produced Dee Halloway's single "Our Love Is Over" together with David Cole. In 1990, he co-wrote and co-produced 2 in a Room's single "Wiggle It", reaching number one on the US Billboard Dance chart.

In 1992, Morel became the A&R vice president of Strictly Rhythm records. Most of his productions during the 1990s were released on that label, among them a series of eleven 12" records called Morel's Grooves from 1992 to 1997, "each 12" showcasing his Latin house sound and being quite popular and influential". 

His chart hits include "Officer Where's Your Brother? (Get Her)" in 1995 (US Dance #17) and "Let's Groove" in 1993 (US Dance #33 and UK #42).

During his career, Morel received six gold record awards, two platinum record awards and four Billboard Music Awards.

External links
George Morel at Discogs
George Morel biography at AllMusic

References

1967 births
Living people
Club DJs
Electronic dance music DJs
DJs from New York City
American electronic musicians
American house musicians
Remixers
Musicians from New York City
Record producers from New York (state)
Hispanic and Latino American musicians
American musicians of Puerto Rican descent